The Staufenberg is a mountain in the Reinhardswald in Kassel, Hesse, Germany.

Mountains of Hesse
Reinhardswald